Natalya Saifutdinova (née Stefanskaya; born 11 February 1989) is a Kazakhstani professional racing cyclist, who most recently rode for UCI Women's Continental Team . She rode in the women's road race at the 2015 UCI Road World Championships.

Major results
Source: 

2007
 3rd Road race, National Road Championships
2009
 National Road Championships
1st  Road race
3rd Time trial
 3rd  Road race, Asian Road Championships
2010
 1st  Time trial, National Road Championships
 2nd  Road race, Asian Road Championships
 4th Road race, Asian Games
2015
 National Road Championships
1st  Road race
2nd Time trial
2016
 National Road Championships
1st  Road race
2nd Time trial
2017
 8th Overall Tour of Thailand
2018
 National Road Championships
1st  Road race
1st  Time trial
 Asian Games
9th Time trial
10th Road race
2019
 2nd  Team time trial, Asian Road Championships
 2nd Time trial, National Road Championships
2020
 7th Grand Prix Manavgat–Side

References

External links

1989 births
Living people
Kazakhstani female cyclists
People from Petropavl
Cyclists at the 2010 Asian Games
Cyclists at the 2018 Asian Games
Asian Games competitors for Kazakhstan
21st-century Kazakhstani women